Leslie Henry Heard (25 May 1893 – 1970) was an English footballer who played in the Football League for Fulham.

References

1893 births
1970 deaths
English footballers
Association football forwards
English Football League players
Southall F.C. players
Fulham F.C. players